Krste Asanović from the University of California, Berkeley has written and co-authored many academic papers concerning computer architecture. He is currently chairman of the Board of the RISC-V Foundation.

Asanović was named Fellow of the Institute of Electrical and Electronics Engineers (IEEE) in 2014 for contributions to computer architecture.  He was elected as an ACM Fellow in 2018 for "contributions to computer architecture, including the open RISC-V instruction set and Agile hardware".

Asanović received a PhD in computer science from Berkeley in 1998 under John Wawrzynek. In 2015, along with RISC-V researchers he co-founded SiFive, a fabless semiconductor company and provider of commercial RISC-V processor IP, where he serves as its chief architect.

References

External links 
Home Page, University of California, Berkeley

Fellow Members of the IEEE
Fellows of the Association for Computing Machinery
Living people
UC Berkeley College of Engineering alumni
Computer designers
Year of birth missing (living people)
Serbian engineers
Serbian computer scientists
American electrical engineers